Rakúsy (German: Roks) is a village and municipality in Kežmarok District in the Prešov Region of north Slovakia.

History
In historical records the village was first mentioned in 1288. It belonged to a German language island. The German population was expelled in 1945.

Geography
The municipality lies at an altitude of 704 metres and covers an area of 6.341 km².

Demographics
According to 2021 census total population has been 3,177. There are 1,662 males and 1,515 females living here.
Rakúsy houses one of the largest communities of Romani people in Slovakia.

Economy and infrastructure
In the village is football pitch, public library, elementary school, foodstuff store and a pub. Cultural sightseeings are evangelical and Roman Catholic churches and a manor house.

References

External links
http://rakusy.e-obce.sk

Villages and municipalities in Kežmarok District